Count Antoine Hector Thésée Treuille de Beaulieu (7 May 1809 – 24 July 1885) was a French General of the 19th century, who developed the concept of rifled guns in the French Army. He studied the subject of rifling between 1840, particularly in the famous Manufacture d'armes de Châtellerault,  and 1852. Following a request by Napoleon III in 1854 to develop such a weapon, the de Beaulieu system was adopted by the French Army. It consisted in cutting six grooves inside the bore of a muzzle-loading cannon, and to use shells equipped with six lugs which would engage the grooves. This development was paralleled by that of the Armstrong gun in Great Britain (adopted in 1858 by the British Army).

About the same time he developed a pinfire falling-block breech-loading carbine (mousqueton) for the Cent-gardes Squadron which was a bit ahead of its time in using a metallic cartridge and is very unusual (for a single-shot weapon) in that it fires from an open bolt.

These developments led to the introduction of the La Hitte system in 1858, a fully integrated system of muzzle-loading rifled guns. The Beaulieu 4-pounder rifled field-gun was adopted by the French Army in 1858, where it replaced the canon-obusier de 12, a smoothbore cannon using shells which was much less accurate and shorter-ranged.

The Beaulieu rifled artillery was first used in Algeria, and then in the Franco-Austrian War in Italy in 1859.

Notes

École Polytechnique alumni
French generals
1809 births
1885 deaths
People from Lunéville